The Georgian Cup (Sakartvelos tasi) is the main cup competition in Georgian football.

The competition is a knockout (single elimination) tournament.

Soviet era cup winners
Previous winners are: 

 1944: Team of Sukhumi
 1945: Dinamo Sukhumi
 1946: Burevestnik Tbilisi
 1947: Dinamo Batumi
 1948: Dinamo Sukhumi
 1949: Factory of Dimitrov
 1950: TODO Tbilisi
 1951: TTU Tbilisi
 1952: TTU Tbilisi
 1953: Dinamo Kutaisi
 1954: TTU Tbilisi
 1955:  Dinamo Kutaisi
 1956: Lokomotiv Tbilisi
 1957: TTU Tbilisi
 1958: Dinamo Batumi
 1959: Kolmeurne Makharadze
 1960: Kolmeurne Makharadze
 1961: SKIF Tbilisi
 1962: Metallurg Zestafoni
 1963: Imereti Kutaisi
 1964: Meshakhte Tkibuli
 1965: Guria Lanchkhuti
 1966: Guria Lanchkhuti

 1967: Sinatle Tbilisi
 1968: Sinatle Tbilisi
 1969: Sinatle Tbilisi
 1970: Egrisi Tskhakaya
 1971: Guria Lanchkhuti
 1972: Kakheti Telavi
 1973: Dinamo Zugdidi
 1974: Metallurg Rustavi
 1975: SKIF Tbilisi
 1976: Meshakhte Tkibuli
 1977: Nadikvari Telavi
 1978: Magaroeli Chiatura
 1979: Magaroeli Chiatura
 1980: Sulori Vani
 1981: Sulori Vani
 1982: Mertskhali Makharadze
 1983: Tbilisskij Zooveterinarnyj Institut
 1984: Dinamo Zugdidi
 1985: Imedi Tbilisi
 1986: Madneuli Bolnisi
 1987: Spartak Tskhinvali
 1988: Shadrevani 83 Tskhaltubo
 1989: Shadrevani 83 Tskhaltubo

Cup finals since independence

Performance by club

References

External links
Cup at UEFA
Cup at soccerway.com

 
National association football cups
Football competitions in Georgia (country)